Abbasabad (also Romanized as ‘Abbāsābād; also known as Abbas Abad Nahar Khan) is a village in Baqeran Rural District, in the Central District of Birjand County, South Khorasan Province, Iran. At the 2006 census, its population was 23, in 12 families.

References 

Populated places in Birjand County